Acacia pachyacra is a tree or shrub belonging to the genus Acacia and the subgenus Phyllodineae. that is endemic to arid parts of central and western Australia.

Description
It branches near or atnnear ground level into a few erect to ascending main stems. It has a soft, dense canopy that produces a hissing sound in windy conditions much the same as a Sheoak (Casuarina or Allocasuarina) or Athol Pine (Tamarix) would. It has smooth greenish bronze or reddish brown coloured bark that is often covered in a fine white powdery coating that is grey and roughened near the base of the trunks. It blooms from August to October and produces yellow flowers.

Taxonomy
The species was first formally described by the botanists Joseph Maiden and William Blakely in 1927 as part of the work  Descriptions of fifty new species and six varieties of western and northern Australian Acacias, and notes on four other species as published in the Journal of the Royal Society of Western Australia. It was reclassified as Racosperma pachyacrum by Leslie Pedley in 2003 then returned to genus Acacia in 2006.
The specific epithet is taken from  Greek words pachys meaning thick and akron meaning top in reference to the thicken mucro at the end of the phyllodes.

Distribution
It is native to an area in the Pilbara and Goldfields regions of Western Australia. Its range extends from coastal areas of the western Pilbara to around the Docker River then further east into the Northern Territory and to far north western South Australia. In Western Australia it is mostly located in the Hamersley and Ophthalmia Ranges where it is commonly situated on dunes or plains growing in sandy soils but also will grow in rocky red loamy soils with a pebble and along ridges of banded ironstone often in spinifex communities and can form forms dense thickets in alluvial washes.

See also
 List of Acacia species

References

pachyacra
Acacias of Western Australia
Taxa named by Joseph Maiden
Taxa named by William Blakely
Plants described in 1927